Samuel Bough  (1822–1878) was an English-born landscape painter who spent much of his career working in Scotland.

Life 

He was born the third of five children in Abbey Street, Carlisle in northern England, the son of James Bough (1794-1845), a shoemaker, and Lucy Walker, a cook. He was raised in relative poverty, but with a keen encouragement in the arts.

He was self-taught but mixed with local artists such as Richard Harrington and George Sheffield, and was strongly influenced by the work of Turner. After an unsuccessful attempt to live as an artist in Carlisle he obtained a job and as a theatre scenery painter in Manchester in 1845, later also working in Glasgow in the same role. Encouraged by Daniel Macnee to take up landscape painting he moved to Hamilton from 1851-4 and worked there with Alexander Fraser. In Cadzow Forest (1857, Bourne Fine Art), influenced by Horatio McCulloch, is a 'magnificent' portrait of two ancient trees. In 1854 he moved to Port Glasgow to work on his technique of painting ships and harbours. He also began supplementing his income by illustrating books, before moving to Edinburgh in 1855.

On coming to Edinburgh he lived in a terraced house at 5 Malta Terrace in the Stockbridge area of the city. Following Turner's example, he became a skillful painter of seaports. Examples include St. Andrews (Noble Grossart) and The Dreadnought from Greenwich Stairs: Sun Sinking into Vapour (1861, private collection).

He later fell out with McCulloch (their dogs apparently taking sides in the dispute). He was admired by Robert Louis Stevenson and painted a view of his house at Swanston, and the construction of Dubh Artach lighthouse. The engineering work for the latter was undertaken by the brothers Thomas and David Stevenson, Robert Louis' father and uncle respectively.

His health began to fail in 1877 and in January 1878 he suffered a stroke. He died of prostate cancer at his later home, Jordan Bank Villa in Morningside, on the south side of the city. R. L. Stevenson penned a glowing obituary of Bough.

He was buried in Dean Cemetery Edinburgh on 23 November 1878. The grave bears a bronze medallion of his head by William Brodie and faces over a southern path to the south terrace.

Notes

References 
 
 MacMillan, Duncan. (1990) Scottish Art 1460-1990. Edinburgh: Mainstream.
 Nicholson, Christopher. (1995) Rock Lighthouses of Britain: The End of an Era? Dunbeath, Caithness: Whittles.

Further reading 
  (Winner of Lakeland Book of the Year 1999)

External links 
 
 

1822 births
1878 deaths
People from Carlisle, Cumbria
Scottish landscape painters
British landscape painters
19th-century Scottish painters
Scottish male painters
Scottish watercolourists
Burials at the Dean Cemetery
Deaths from cancer in Scotland
Deaths from prostate cancer
19th-century Scottish male artists